The Indonesia national rugby union sevens is a minor sevens side. They have competed at the Hong Kong Sevens, and were runners up in the plate competition in 1977.

History
Rugby was first introduced in Indonesia during the Dutch colonial period, and was played mostly by ex-pats.  In March 1976 an Indonesian Sevens squad, alongside twelve other nations, participated in the inaugural Hong Kong Sevens tournament. Indonesia returned to Hong Kong again for the 1976 tournament where they lost to Tonga in the plate final.  Indonesia continued to participate in the tournament until 1986 after which, interest began to wane and the program went on hiatus.

Indonesia returned to competitive sevens rugby at the 2012 HSBC Asian Rugby Sevens Series after having some success with their fifteens program.

Tournament Record

(DNP) = Did not place,  (―) = W/L record unavailable

References

Rugby union in Indonesia
Indonesia national rugby union team
National rugby sevens teams